Luciano Rondinella (died 27 June 2020) was an Italian singer and actor.

References

External links
Luciano Rondinella on IMDb
 

2020 deaths
20th-century Italian male singers
21st-century Italian male singers
20th-century Italian male actors
21st-century Italian male actors